The Frank and Lucille Sharp Gymnasium is a 1,000-seat multi-purpose arena in Houston, Texas. It was built in 1963 and is home to the Houston Christian University Huskies basketball and volleyball teams.

Sharp Gymnasium served as the temporary home court for the 2007-08 Rice Owls women's team for nine home games while Rice University renovated Autry Court to Tudor Fieldhouse.

Gallery

See also
 List of NCAA Division I basketball arenas

Footnotes

References

External links 
Arena information

Houston Christian Huskies basketball
College basketball venues in the United States
College volleyball venues in the United States
Sports venues in Texas
Basketball venues in Texas
Indoor arenas in Texas
Volleyball venues in Houston
Southland Conference volleyball
Sports venues completed in 1964
1964 establishments in Texas